The Diocese of Korea is a diocese of the Russian Orthodox Church which covers the territory Korea. It is part of the Patriarchal Exarchate in South-East Asia.

History

Eastern Orthodoxy in the region 
Convention of Peking in 1860 created short border between Korea and Russia. Therefore relations between Korea and Russia were improved. History of Eastern Orthodoxy in Korea was started when  Russian Empire decided to send Russian Orthodox missionaries to Korea.

On the other hands, Orthodox Church in Japan was also belonged to Russian Orthodox Church.  Therefore Japanese occupation of Korea resulted persecution of Orthodox Christian believers but did not terminated whole relations between Russian Orthodox Church and Eastern Orthodoxy in Korea. Liberation of Korea terminated relations between Orthodox Church in Japan and Orthodox Church in Korea. Furthermore, Division of Korea cut Russia-South Korean relations. Therefore Korean Orthodox Christian believers in South Korea decided to establish relations with Ecumenical Patriarchate of Constantinople or Greek Orthodox church.

Because Eastern Orthodoxy was a minor religion and North Korean authority did not like religions, Russian Orthodox Church in North Korea was also suspended.

Dissolution of the Soviet Union created Russian Orthodox Church's interests in South Korea and North Korea.

In 2002, Kim Jong-il decided to construct an Eastern Orthodox church in North Korea. Therefore Church of the Life-Giving Trinity was established. North Korean Orthodox community established relations with Russian Orthodox Church and Ecumenical Patriarchate of Constantinople.

Korean Orthodox Church opposed and condemned Russian Orthodox Church's interests in South Korea and Russian chuch's jurisdictional claim on Orthodox church in North Korea.

After 2018 Moscow–Constantinople schism, Russian Orthodox Church formally opened new churches in South Korea and established Diocese of Korea in 2019.

Ruling bishops 
 Sergius (Chashin) (26 February — 4 April 2019)
 Theophanes (Kim)  (since 4 April 2019)

References 

Eastern Orthodox Church bodies in Asia
Christian organizations established in 2019
Eastern Orthodoxy in Korea